Deshaun Davis (born December 31, 1995) is an American football coach and former player. He is currently the linebackers coach at the University of North Alabama. Davis played college football at Auburn as an inside linebacker.

High school career
Davis was all-state at Vigor High School his sophomore and junior seasons. A torn ACL ended Davis' senior year. He committed to Auburn on April 17, 2013, choosing the Tigers over Clemson, Florida State, LSU and Kentucky. In addition to football, Davis played basketball and baseball at Vigor.

College career
At Auburn, Davis redshirted his true freshman year and did not make the starting lineup until his redshirt sophomore season. During his redshirt freshman season, then-defensive coordinator Will Muschamp told Davis to expect no playing time, leaving the player to consider a transfer. Davis started occasionally taking over playcalling duties from defensive coordinator Kevin Steele. During his senior season, Davis led the team in tackles and was named first-team all-Southeastern Conference. An ankle tweak against Mississippi State threatened to derail his season, but Davis did not miss any games as a result of that injury. After his senior season, Davis participated in the Senior Bowl.

Professional career

Cincinnati Bengals
Davis was selected by the Cincinnati Bengals in the sixth round (210th overall) of the 2019 NFL Draft. After recording fifteen tackles in the preseason, he was waived during final roster cuts on August 31, 2019.

Jacksonville Jaguars
On September 2, 2019, Davis was signed to the Jacksonville Jaguars practice squad, but was released two days later.

Philadelphia Eagles
On December 18, 2019, Davis was signed to the Philadelphia Eagles' practice squad. He was released on January 1, 2020.

Saskatchewan Roughriders
Davis signed with the Saskatchewan Roughriders of the CFL on May 6, 2020. After the CFL canceled the 2020 season due to the COVID-19 pandemic, Davis chose to opt-out of his contract with the Roughriders on August 27, 2020. Davis was selected by the Conquerors of The Spring League during its player selection draft on October 12, 2020, and opted back in to his contract with the Roughriders on January 4, 2021.

Coaching career
Davis started his coaching career as a graduate assistant at the University of Central Florida in 2022. On December 7, 2022, he was announced as the first member of Brent Dearmon's staff coaching linebackers at North Alabama.

Personal life
Davis is a Christian.

References

External links
Auburn Tigers bio

1995 births
Living people
People from Prichard, Alabama
Players of American football from Alabama
American football linebackers
Auburn Tigers football players
Cincinnati Bengals players
Jacksonville Jaguars players
Philadelphia Eagles players
Saskatchewan Roughriders players
The Spring League players